Kitchen Table International was a fictitious computer company created as a faux amalgam of Radio Shack, Apple Inc., Commodore Business Machines, and other organizations of the time, and was the subject of one of the earliest regular computer humor columns, appearing in Wayne Green's 80 Micro magazine from January 1981 through July, 1983.  It was invented by computer journalist David D. Busch, and billed as the "world's leading supplier of fictitious hardware, software, firmware, and limpware". Each month a new "innovation" was introduced that poked fun at the infant personal computer industry.  These included a "black phosphor" computer monitor, and a programming language with all the worst features of BASIC and COBOL, called BASBOL.  The fictional company's flagship product was the TLS-8E, a computer which was sold with a factory-applied coating of oxidation on its peripheral edge card connectors ("to protect them from electricity"), a 5-inch "sloppy" disk drive, and a keyboard that eschewed the familiar QWERTY array for a 16-key matrix that included a TBA (To Be Announced) key.

According to Busch, the operation was founded by one "Scott Nolan Hollerith" (after Adventure programmer Scott Adams, Atari co-founder Nolan Bushnell, and computer pioneer Herman Hollerith).  S.N. Hollerith, it was said, graduated from the University of California at Phoenix in 1970 with a degree in Slide Rule Design, and quickly built KTI into a multi-thousand-dollar empire on a foundation of selling maintenance upgrades for DROSS-DOS 8E, a microcomputer operating system that was a subset of CP/M.  In 1981, KTI introduced the world's "first" 32-bit microprocessor, created by piggy-backing two 16-bit chips on top of each other, until it was discovered that, at best, only one of the two chips actually functioned at any given time and, at worst, they spent a lot of time fighting over whose turn it was.   The KTI staff gradually phased Hollerith out of active participation by relocating to a new, high-tech facility in Cupertino, California, and not telling him where it was.

Many of the phony products "introduced" by Kitchen Table International were actually introduced later. Several years after the company demonstrated its Reverse LPRINT command, which allowed a dot-matrix printer to function as a scanner (the demo was actually a videotape run backwards, showing sheets of text feeding into a printer and coming out blank after they had been "scanned"), Thunderware introduced the Thunderscan scanner, which replaced the ribbon cartridge of an Apple ImageWriter with a scanning module.

Sorry About The Explosion!
The Kitchen Table columns won the only Best Fiction Book award from the Computer Press Association for Busch in 1985, when he collected, revised, and edited the existing columns and some new material into a book, Sorry About The Explosion! published by Prentice-Hall. Never a best-seller, it achieved cult status largely from the popularity of the monthly KTI columns. The title of the book came from the subject line of a "memo" in the book from KTI R & D director Otto Wirk to company president Scott Nolan Hollerith sheepishly explaining that the organization's latest product had an MTBE (Mean Time Between Explosions) of only 100 hours.

Although not as pointed as the classic The Devil's DP Dictionary by Stan Kelly-Bootle, the book, and the Kitchen Table International columns it was largely based upon, poked fun at the foibles of companies like Apple Computer, Radio Shack, Commodore, and Atari in an era when the early computer magazines were filled with technical articles, code listings, and discussions of the latest and greatest hardware, and not much regular humor. When the KTI column ceased publication in July, 1983, Busch collected all the existing material, reorganized it by topic, and wrote new pieces to produce Sorry About The Explosion!.

References

External links

Fictional companies
Computer humor